Mina, also known as Muna, and commonly known as the "City of Tents" is a valley and neighborhood located in the Masha'er district in the Makkah Province of Saudi Arabia,  southeast of the city of Mecca, covering an area of approximately . Mina incorporates the tents, the Jamarat area, and the slaughterhouses just outside the tent city.

Mina is most famous for its role in the Hajj ("Pilgrimage"). To accommodate the pilgrims who stay in Mina over multiple nights in the month of Dhu al-Hijjah, more than 100,000 air-conditioned tents have been built in the area, giving Mina the nickname "City of Tents." With a capacity of up to 3 million people, Mina has been called the largest tent city in the world. The three Jamarat, located in the Mina valley, are the location of the Stoning of the Devil, performed between sunrise and sunset in the final days of the Hajj. The stone throwing ritual commemorates the Islamic Prophet Ibrahim (Abraham)'s stoning of the devil, who wanted to prevent him from carrying out the command of Allāh to sacrifice his son, Isma'il (Ishmael).

History 

In Islamic tradition, Ibrahim left his wife, Hagar (Hagar) and their son, Isma'il, in the valley of Mecca when Ishmael was an infant. Upon one of his visits to his family in Mecca, he was ordered by Allah in a dream to sacrifice his son in the Mina valley. While carrying out his sacrifice, he was interrupted by a devil and was commanded by Allah to stone the devil. The ritual of the stoning of the Devil is a commemoration of this belief. Mina is also believed to be the location of the pledges of al-Aqabah.

Before the tents were built, pilgrims would bring their own tents to the valley and dismantle them while returning from the Hajj. Sometime in the 1990s, permanent cotton tents were installed by the Saudi government. These cotton tents were especially susceptible to fires, which took many of the pilgrims' lives. These are constructed of fiberglass with an outer coating of Teflon to protect them from fires. The tents are grouped into camps, each with their own exterior walls, and divided by the nationalities of pilgrims, providing temporary accommodation to up to 3 million pilgrims. Each camp is equipped with a kitchen, bathrooms, and ablution facilities, and is connected to the other camps by pathways. The tents are also marked with unique color-and-number pairs to make them more identifiable.

Incidents during the Hajj 

Owing to its location and the extreme numbers of pilgrims during the Hajj, Mina and the surrounding region, especially the Jamarat Bridge, are hotspots for stampedes, the deadliest of which was the 2015 stampede, resulting in the deaths of more than 2,000 pilgrims:

Geography 

Mina is situated in the eponymous Mina valley, at an elevation of approximately 400 m (1320 ft). It is bordered by the al-'Aziziyah district of Mecca in the west, the 4th Ring Road to the north, Muzdalifah to the east, and the al-Jami'ah district to the south. The westernmost features of Mina are the three Jamarat, which are stoned during the Stoning of the Devil. These are, the Jamarat al-Sughra', the westernmost and smallest, the Jamarat al-Wusta', the intermediary, and the Jamarat al-Kubra''', also called Jamarat al-'Aqabah, the largest and easternmost. In a 2003 study, the distance between the first two was measured to be 135 m (443 ft) and the distance between the latter two was measured at 225 m (738 ft). To the north-east of Mina are the slaughterhouses, where the sacrificial animals of the Hajj pilgrims are slaughtered. The Masjid al-Khayf is located in the centre of the Mina valley, and is active only during the Hajj.

 Infrastructure 

 Transport 
The Mashaer Al-Muqaddassah Metro, currently Saudi Arabia's only complete metro line, is active only during the Hajj, and ends in Mina, near the Jamarat al-'Aqaba'', with Mina Station 3. Running northwest, it starts in 'Arafat, going through Muzdalifah, before reaching Mina Station 1, near the Armed Forces Hospital. Finally, the line terminates near the Jamarat, at Mina Station 3.

See also 
 Sarat Mountains
 Hijaz Mountains

References

External links 

 Mina photograph gallery

Geography of Saudi Arabia
Hajj
Neighborhoods of Mecca